was a Japanese aristocrat and government official of the early Heian period. He was the son of Ohno no Nao.

Ohno no Mataka served at a high rank at court for a long time during the early Heian period.

References

Bibliography
 Tei Morita Shokunihonkoki (Last volume) Kodansha, 2010

782 births
843 deaths